Bathyteuthis is the singular genus of squid in the family Bathyteuthidae, encompassing three species.

Bathyteuthis species are found scattered throughout the world’s oceans at mesopelagic to bathypelagic depths, commonly between 700 and 2,000 meters. They are found in deep-sea territories and can be spotted on the coast of New England.

The genus contains bioluminescent species.

Description
Bathyteuthis are deep reddish maroon in colour and small in size, with none exceeding 80 mm in mantle length. The arms on Bathyteuthis are short, joined by a low, fleshy web, with suckers arranged in irregular rows (two proximally increasing to four distally). Tentacular clubs are short and narrow, with 8-10 longitudinal series of numerous, minute suckers. Buccal connectives have small suckers attached to the dorsal border of the ventral arms (arms IV). Fins are small, round and separate. The head has eyes turned slightly to the front. Suckers lack circularis muscles. Females have paired oviducts.

Reproduction 
While the reproduction of many deep-sea squids is poorly known, one Bathyteuthis species, B. berryi, is known to brood its eggs after spawning. It lays relatively few eggs but these eggs are large, protected from predators and parasites, and develop and hatch at a depth decided by the parent.

Taxonomy

Bathyteuthis shares some characters with oegopsid squid and others with the Myopsida, hence its placement in a separate suborder, the Bathyteuthoidea, by some authorities. The paired oviducts (in females) and suckers without circularis muscles are characteristic of ordinary Oegopsida. However, buccal connective tissue with suckers and tentacle pockets in the head are characters found in myopsid squid, but absent in the Oegopsida.

Species
Bathyteuthis abyssicola, deepsea squid
Bathyteuthis bacidifera
Bathyteuthis berryi

References

FAO Bathyteuthidae

External links

Squid
Bioluminescent molluscs
Taxa named by William Evans Hoyle